Wiretap Scars is an album by Sparta, released on August 13, 2002 on DreamWorks Records and peaked at number 71 on the Billboard 200. Only months separated this release from their debut EP Austere. The album is greatly influenced by the music of At the Drive-In, with whom most of Sparta's members originally played before their split in 2001.

The vocals and track naming in particular reflect At the Drive-In's Relationship of Command, the last album made by the group. This is in contrast to the music of The Mars Volta, formed by two other members of ATDI (Omar and Cedric), which departs entirely from the post-hardcore genre.

Critical reception

Wiretap Scars garnered positive reviews from music critics. At Metacritic, which assigns a normalized rating out of 100 to reviews from mainstream critics, the album received an average rating of 69, based on 14 reviews.

Drowned in Sound's Andy Frankowski commended the band for retaining the Drive-In sound while offering a more controlled melodic approach to it, concluding that "[T]hey show a different sign of maturing; it's a kind of growing older without really aging. They have the same talent they had before but it's the way they deliver it that will have eyes being opened and ears to the ground." Jason Jackowiak of Splendid commented about the record, "With Wiretap Scars, Sparta have not only made great strides in the progression of their art form; they've also acknowledged the artists who inspired them. That said, the question remains: will Sparta gain recognition on the basis of their own merits, or are they forever to be judged against the accomplishments of their previous employers? Only time will tell." Sputnikmusic emeritus Damrod praised the band's musicality for its use of instruments and electronic beats to craft quiet yet rough tracks that flow well throughout the record, concluding that "This is a great album by a great band. Definitely one of the better Indie/Post-Hardcore bands out there. The production is good, the overall feel of the album as well. If you liked ATD-I, I guess you will have kind of easy access to this one, though it is much more mellow than most stuff by ATD-I." Noel Murray of The A.V. Club said that, "Dialing down At The Drive-In's ferociousness and concentrating more on its exploration of dynamic, textured volume, Sparta has made a smartly produced, superficially exciting record full of deafening electric hum, full-throated shouts, and quiet, intricately picked guitar breaks."

Alternative Press ranked "Cut Your Ribbon" at number 61 on their list of the best 100 singles from the 2000s.

Track listing

Personnel
Credits adapted from the liner notes of Wiretap Scars.

Sparta
 Jim Ward – guitar, vocals
 Paul Hinojos – guitar
 Matt Miller – bass
 Tony Hajjar – drums

Additional musicians
Finn Mannich – cello

Artwork
Jason Noto
Doug Cunningham

Production
Jerry Finn – producer, mixing
Joe McGrath – engineer
Alex Aligizakis – 2nd engineer
Mike Fasano – drum tech
Jeff Moses – mix assistant

Charts

References

External links

2002 albums
Sparta (band) albums
DreamWorks Records albums
Albums produced by Jerry Finn
Albums recorded at Armoury Studios